Selene is a rural locality in the North Burnett Region, Queensland, Australia. In the  Selene had a population of 25 people.

Geography 
Tuturi is a neighbourhood in the north of the locality near the former railway station of the same name.  The name Tuturi was assigned by the Queenland Railways Department and is word from the Waka language, meaning grey box tree.

History 
Selene State School opened on 25 January 1926 and closed on 25 July 1965. It was located at 261 Selene Hall Road.

The now-closed Mungar Junction to Monto railway line opened to Selene in 1927. The locality was served by two now-abandoned stations:

 Tuturi railway station
 Selene railway station

Selene Baptist Church was officially opened by Reverend Benjamin Hewison (President of the Queensland Baptist Union) on Saturday 13 May 1933.

The last train on the railway line was in 2008 and in 2012 it was announced the line was officially closed.

In the  Selene had a population of 25 people.

References

Further reading 

  — includes Selene State School

North Burnett Region
Localities in Queensland